Matthew Barry Solomon (born 19 February 1996) is a Hong Kong racing driver.

Career 
Solomon began his motorsport career in kart racing in 2007, where he remained active until 2012. In 2013, Solomon switched to formula racing and competed for Eurasia Motorsport in Formula Masters China. He scored in every race and scored four third places for best results. He finished fifth in the overall standings. In addition, he completed as a guest drive in Formula Renault for Prema in Europe. 2014 Solomon remained in the Formula Masters China at Eurasia Motorsport. He won five races and finished second overall with 187 to 215 points James Munro. In addition, Solomon was active in GT sports in 2014. He finished ninth in the Chinese Audi R8 LMS Cup and 28th in the GT3 class of the Asian GT Championship.

In the winter of 2014/15, Solomon competed for a MRF Challenge Formula 2000 event, finishing second. Subsequently, Solomon 2015 moved to European Formula 3 Championship to Double R Racing.

He is consultant ("in-house racing specialist") for computergame-company Animoca Brands.

Racing record

Career summary

† As he as a guest driver, Solomon was ineliglble to score points.

Personal life 
Solomon was born to an Australian father and Chinese mother. He usually drives under the Hong Kong license, but he also has an Australian passport.

References

External links

1996 births
Living people
Hong Kong racing drivers
Hong Kong people of Australian descent
FIA Formula 3 European Championship drivers
Karting World Championship drivers
MRF Challenge Formula 2000 Championship drivers
Australian Endurance Championship drivers
Formula Masters China drivers
Double R Racing drivers
Eurasia Motorsport drivers
Prema Powerteam drivers
Formula Renault 2.0 Alps drivers
Australian racing drivers